The Legal Consequences of the Construction of a Wall in the Occupied Palestinian Territory (commonly known as the Israeli Wall advisory opinion) of 9 July 2004 is an advisory opinion issued by the International Court of Justice (ICJ) in relation to the Israeli West Bank barrier.

The court responded to a request from the United Nations General Assembly of 10 December 2003 on the legal question under international law of the Israeli West Bank barrier built by Israel that partially follows the Green Line boundary between Israel and the West Bank and partially enters into the Israeli-occupied West Bank. The barrier has been a controversial subject and a cause of heightened tensions in the Israeli–Palestinian conflict. Israel argued that the barrier was necessary to keep out West Bank militants and avert more suicide attacks against its citizens.

Israel began construction of the barrier during the Second Intifada in September 2000, along and exceeding beyond the 1949 Green Line.

In its non-binding opinion, the Court found that the barrier violates international law and should be torn down. The vote of the justices was 14 to 1, with Thomas Buergenthal dissenting.

The judgement was invoked in November 2006 by Al-Haq, a Palestinian human rights group, which brought a case in the UK Court of Appeal against the British government to end export licences to Israel to "secure the implementation of the July 2004 [ICJ] Advisory Opinion on Israel's Wall". The case was dismissed in November 2008. 

The judgement was also referred to in United Nations General Assembly Resolution 66/225 of 22 December 2011.

See also 
 International law and the Arab–Israeli conflict
 Israeli West Bank barrier
 UN motion to seek ICJ opinion on the legal implications of Israel's occupation of Palestinian territory

References

External links 
 General Assembly resolution ES-10/14 of 12 December 2003
 International Court of Justice, Order of 19 December 2003
 International Court of Justice, Order of 30 January 2004
 International Court of Justice, Advisory Opinion of 9 July 2004
 International Court of Justice, filings and materials on the case

International Court of Justice cases
Israeli–Palestinian conflict and the United Nations
2004 in international relations
Israeli West Bank barrier
Borders of Israel
Borders of the West Bank
Geography of the West Bank
Israeli Security Forces
Human rights abuses in the State of Palestine
2004 documents
2004 in case law